Paul Bernard (20 June 1929 – 25 September 1997) was an English television director and production designer.

Bernard was born in London, England. As a designer he worked on series including The Avengers. His direction credits include Coronation Street, The Tomorrow People, Z-Cars, four episodes of Virgin of the Secret Service (1968) (for which he also worked as a supervising producer with Robert D. Cardona),  and the Doctor Who stories Day of the Daleks (1972), The Time Monster (1972) and Frontier in Space (1973).

References

External links 
 

1929 births
1997 deaths
British television directors
Television people from London